VC Zenit-Kazan, until 2008 known as Dinamo Tattransgaz Kazan, is a professional men's volleyball team based in Kazan, Russia. It plays in the Super League (10-time champion). The team won the 2007–08, 2011–12, 2014–15, 2015-16, 2016-17, and 2017-18 CEV Champions League titles, thus being the most-titled club in its new history.

Achievements

International competitions 
  CEV Champions League
Winners (6):   2008, 2012, 2015, 2016, 2017, 2018
Runners-up (2):  2011, 2019
Third place (1):  2013
FIVB Club World Championship
Winners (1):  2017
Runners-up (2):  2015, 2016
Third place (3):  2009, 2011,2019
Domestic competitions
Russian Super League 
Winners (10):  2007, 2009, 2010, 2011, 2012, 2014, 2015, 2016, 2017, 2018
Runners-up (2):  2019, 2020
Third place (5):  2004, 2005, 2008, 2013, 2022
Russian Cup
Winners (11):   2004, 2007, 2009, 2014, 2015, 2016, 2017, 2018, 2019, 2021, 2022
Russian SuperCup
Winners (8):  2010, 2011, 2012, 2015, 2016, 2017, 2018, 2020

History
The club was founded on 13 May 2000 by the decision of Tatarstan Ministry of Internal Affairs and Kazan City Administration. It was formed at the base of Directorate of Internal Affairs and aimed at taking part in games of Russian Championship First League.

Team roster
Team roster - season 2021/2022

Notable players
Notable, former or current players of club, who are medalist of intercontinental tournaments in national teams or clubs.

Stadium
Kazan Volleyball Centre is a modern complex with a total area of 13 thousand square meters. The capacity of the main arena is 5,000 spectators, the small one 700. They have all the necessary support facilities and well-equipped gyms. The arena is located at Midhat Bulatov Street.

Kit manufacturer
The table below shows the history of kit providers for the Zenit-Kazan team.

Sponsorship
Primary sponsors include: main sponsors like Gazprom. Other sponsors: Ministry of Internal Affairs, Adidas, TNT, Blimp, Gazeta.ru, TFB Bank and Championat.com.

References

External links
 Official website 
 Official website 

Russian volleyball clubs
Sport in Kazan
Volleyball clubs established in 2000
2000 establishments in Russia